Thomas Ernest Brennan (January 22, 1922 – September 27, 2003) was an American professional ice hockey right winger who played twelve National Hockey League (NHL) games over parts of two seasons for the Boston Bruins. He moved to Montreal, Canada at the age of 15 in order to improve his skills. He returned to his native Philadelphia in 1942 where he played one season in the Eastern Hockey League before the Bruins signed him to a major league contract.

Career statistics

Regular season and playoffs

References

External links

1922 births
2003 deaths
American men's ice hockey right wingers
Boston Bruins players
Boston Olympics players
Ice hockey players from Pennsylvania
Montreal Junior Canadiens players
Montreal Victorias players
Quebec Aces (QSHL) players
Sportspeople from Philadelphia